Dryad (Callie Betto) is a fictional character appearing in American comic books published by Marvel Comics. Created by Nunzio DeFilippis and Christina Weir, she first appeared in New X-Men: Academy X #1.

Fictional character biography
Dryad is a member of the former Corsairs training squad. The leaders of the team are: Specter, Quill and the Stepford Cuckoos. She appears in New X-Men: Academy X #2 as a background character, in the party, on the cover with Anole, and with the students that aren't fighting with the Blob.

Depowered and Death
After Scarlet Witch's actions of M-Day, Dryad is de-energized and boards a bus with other depowered students leaving the Xavier Institute. She is killed when William Stryker fires a missile at the bus, killing the depowered students aboard.

Powers and abilities
Dryad had the mutant ability to communicate with plants, much like a telepath can with people, which allowed her to manipulate plant life. It was not a particularly strong connection in that she had to actively maintain a link (a plant cannot simply call out telepathically to her mind) for communication to occur. It is for this reason that she rarely used the power and tended to forget about it at times.

In the explanation that she gave at one point, she explained that when a plant communicates, it is not like humans or animals because plants do not have emotions. They cannot express fear, excitement, happiness, etc. Instead, Callie explained plants as “speaking” in senses. For example, if a plant needed water, Callie would receive wetness. She wouldn't feel wet, but because she knows what wetness is from prior experience, she would be able to understand. The same holds true for when she spoke to them. She could only focus on one “thought” at a time; usually the ones she understood. When she didn't understand (for example if the plant is being killed off by a certain chemical that she wouldn't respond to) she could sometimes offer vague explanations about the general state of the plant, or she had simply no idea what was going on.

Callie could accelerate, decelerate, or reverse plant growth in a twenty-foot radius. The type of growth that occurred depended on each plant. Smaller, less complex plants would grow very quickly (for example vines, weeds, flowers, etc.) while larger plants, such as trees, she could only control a section. For example, she could cause a branch of a tree to bend at an angle from the tree. It is not possible to grow a full tree in a single sitting; it requires a considerable amount of time and concentration to achieve it.

After Decimation, Dryad lost her powers.

Alternate versions

Too Much Information
In the storyline "Too Much Information", Dryad appears as one of the future X-Men that is blown up during the mission to find the Hellions.

References

 Comics characters introduced in 2004
 Marvel Comics female characters
 Marvel Comics mutants
 Marvel Comics plant characters
 Fictional characters with plant abilities
 Characters created by Nunzio DeFilippis
 Characters created by Christina Weir